Saratak is a village in the Artik Municipality of the Shirak Province of Armenia.

Demographics

References 

Nahapetyan A.R., Ottoman Population Census of the Sanjak of Upper Basen of 1835: an Example of Koprukoy village // Shirak Center for Armenian Studies

World Gazeteer: Armenia – World-Gazetteer.com

Populated places in Shirak Province